Jeff Isaacson (born July 14, 1983) is an American curler. He is a two-time Olympian, playing on the United States men's curling team at the 2010 and 2014 Winter Olympics.

Career
Isaacson played as second on John Shuster's team which won the US Olympic Trials in February 2009 and earned a spot as the 2010 United States Olympic Team. In addition to John Shuster his other teammates were John Benton and Jason Smith. Chris Plys joined the team as alternate after the Olympic Trials. At the 2010 Winter Olympics in Vancouver, Canada they finished in 10th place.

By winning the 2010 US Olympic Trials, his team also qualified for the 2009 World Men's Championship held in Moncton, Canada. Isaacson and his team finished with a 7–4 record. They lost a tiebreaker match against Team Norway to qualify for the semifinals and finished fifth overall.

Isaacson left Shuster's team after the 2010 Olympics to take time away from competitive curling but returned for the 2013 Olympic Trials where they again won. At the 2014 Winter Olympics in Sochi, Russia they finished in 9th place.

Personal life
Isaacson has degrees from Bemidji State University and University of Wisconsin-Superior. He currently works at the Chaska Curling Center as the Curling Center Manager.

Teammates
2009 Moncton World Championships

2010 Vancouver Winter Olympics

John Shuster, Skip
Jason Smith, Third
John Benton, Lead
Chris Plys, Alternate

References

External links

1983 births
Living people
American male curlers
People from Gilbert, Minnesota
Olympic curlers of the United States
Curlers at the 2010 Winter Olympics
Curlers at the 2014 Winter Olympics
Sportspeople from Minnesota
Universiade medalists in curling
Universiade gold medalists for the United States
Competitors at the 2007 Winter Universiade
American curling champions
Medalists at the 2007 Winter Universiade